{{Infobox civil conflict
| title = 2022 North Macedonia protests
| partof = 
| image = File:NMK_Protests_2022.jpg
| caption = Main protest rally in Skopje. Opposition leaders holding the main banner of the protests stating "Ultimatum, no thank you"
| date = 2 July 2022 - 11 August 2022
| place = Skopje, North Macedonia
| coordinates = 
| causes = *Bulgaria–North Macedonia bilateral issues
Rejection of the French proposal by the opposition parties in North Macedonia
Anti-Bulgarian sentiment in North Macedonia
Euroscepticism in North Macedonia
Pro-Russian and pro-Serbian sentiments in North Macedonia<ref>According to Nikolay Krastev the protests of recent days are anti-European nova.bg news, July 5, 2022.</ref>
Demanding exclusion of the bilateral Bulgarian-North Macedonia issues from the European accession process.
Insisting on a guarantee from the EU that that the inclusion of the Bulgarians in the constitution will be the last request of the accession process.
| goals = Convince the Government of North Macedonia to reject the French proposal.
| methods = 
| status = 
| result = French proposal approved by the Assembly of North Macedonia.
| injuries = *10 protesters
54 policemen
| arrests = 
| detentions = 
| charged = 23 (Per the Ministry of Internal Affairs of North Macedonia)
| fined = 
| casualties_label = 
| notes = 
}}

In early July 2022, protests began in Skopje, North Macedonia. The protests were triggered by Bulgaria–North Macedonia negotiations surrounding the accession of the latter into the European Union.

 Background 
North Macedonia has been a candidate to join the European Union (EU) since 2005. The use of the country name "Macedonia" was the object of a dispute with neighbouring Greece between 1991 and 2019, resulting in a Greek veto against EU and NATO accession talks, which lasted from 2008 to 2019. After the issue was resolved, the EU gave its formal approval to begin accession talks in March 2020. However, in November 2020, Bulgaria refused to approve the European Union's negotiation framework for North Macedonia, thereby blocking the start of the country's negotiations with the EU, having prior made demands for North Macedonia to fulfil the 2017 Bulgarian-Macedonian Friendship Treaty. The conclusion of the treaty played a decisive role in Bulgaria's agreement to approve North Macedonia's NATO candidacy, and its implementation is considered by it a key to the negotiation process with the EU. North Macedonia and Bulgaria have very complicated relations, and the Bulgarian factor is known in Macedonian politics as "B-complex". Against this background, the main pretension of Sofia to Skopje today is to admit to sharing a common history with Bulgaria until the end of the WWII, and the separation of the Macedonian language and nation in post-WWII Yugoslavia, but on a profoundly anti-Bulgarian basis. The constitution of North Macedonia has recognized the Albanian, Turkish, Vlach, Serbian, Roma, Bosniak and other peoples, but the protesters insist that at the behest of Sofia, if Bulgarians would be recognized, it also formally would recognize that the Macedonian nation and language have Bulgarian roots and would undermine the Macedonian national identity.

In June 2022, France, at the end of its rotating Presidency of the Council of the European Union, sent a proposal (known as the French proposal) for the negotiation framework of North Macedonia, as well as to serve as a compromise deal between North Macedonia and Bulgaria.

 The French proposal  
President Macron’s proposal included several demands for North Macedonia:

 A condition requested by Bulgaria that the protocols relating to the implementation of the 2017 Bulgarian-Macedonian Friendship Treaty, to become part of the European negotiating framework, including historic bilateral issues, directly related to the Bulgarian veto imposed on the EU accession talks with North Macedonia, due to non-performance of the Treaty.
 A demand for EU to accept issues related to the history, identity and language of the Macedonian people becoming part of the accession process, despite them not being related to the accession criteria, but are directly related to the Bulgarian veto imposed on North Macedonia due to non-performance of the treaty.
 The proposal also calls for North Macedonia to acknowledge the existence of an ethnic Bulgarian minority and to incorporate it into the country's constitution, which the ruling political parties in North Macedonia have accepted.

The proposal envisages concessions from both sides. Originally, Bulgaria had made far greater demands, touching on language issues and the way North Macedonia records its history. In fact, on 24 June, after heated discussions, the Bulgarian parliament had already approved this proposal. The ruling political coalition parties in North Macedonia have accepted the agreement. North Macedonia's President Pendarovski and the Social Democrat-led government backed the proposed deal too.

 Criticism of the French proposal 
The French Proposal was criticised by some high European politicians, historians and intellectuals.

Erwan Fouéré, former European Union Special Representative on the French proposal: "Yet another failure of EU leadership in the Western Balkans".; "Issues related to the history, identity and language becoming part of the accession process, despite the fact that they have absolutely nothing to do with the accession criteria"; "Lack of reciprocity with Bulgaria ignoring all of the relevant judgments from the European Court of Human Rights (ECHR) on the Macedonian minority in Bulgaria". According to him, Bulgaria insists on imposing its own version of events during and after the World War II, and the proposal "would open the door to future bilateral disputes, weaken the EU’s transformative power in promoting the rule of law and independent judicial reforms and undermine the EU’s entire accession process".

Florian Bieber, political scientist, expert on the Balkans and professor of politics and history of Southeast Europe at the University of Graz, is also very critical. He described it as a "disaster for EU enlargement". According to him, the French proposal will encourage extreme nationalists and increase inter-ethnic tensions. He also pointed out the "double standards" with Bulgaria in relation to the treatment of its ethnic Macedonian minority and criticized Bulgaria for insisting that nothing in the accession process can be interpreted as a recognition of the existence of the Macedonian language. According to him, the proposal sets a "dangerous precedent", by accepting bilateral issues in the EU enlargement process and would encourage revisionist nationalist bullying by more powerful neighbours against those outside the EU.

Ulf Brunnbauer, Austrian historian, academic, professor of history of Southeast and Eastern Europe Studies and Director of the Leibniz Institute for East and Southeast European Studies, has similar objections in his criticism of the proposal.

 Support for the French proposal 
The first foreign minister of the then Republic of Macedonia and professor of international law, Denko Maleski, said that the proposal should be supported and that it can unite North Macedonia and Bulgaria into finding a solution, stressing the importance of France in resolving the problem.

According to Macedonian intellectual Katerina Kolozova, the proposal does not threaten Macedonian identity and language. She also criticised the opposition for what she described as "... the opposition's disinformation campaign against the document succeeded in drawing in supposedly “neutral” and pro-Western civil society organisations, which also raised the banners of “NO to [this] EU” and “NO to an EU that wants to render us Bulgarian”."

 Protests 

The protests, which started on 2 July, are organized by some nationalist and leftist parties, primarily VMRO-DPMNE, its coalition Renewal, Levica, Democratic Party of Serbs in Macedonia and others. They rejected the EU's proposal to approve the country's negotiating framework, also known as the French proposal. The protesters rallied under the slogan "Ultimatum, No Thanks!" They also carried posters with inscriptions: "Fuck the EU" and "Bulgarian fascism - European value". On July 4, protesters symbolically burned the 2017 Treaty of Friendship, Good Neighborliness and Cooperation with Bulgaria, the 2018 Prespa agreement with Greece and the so-called French proposal for the start of North Macedonia's negotiation process with the EU, calling these documents fascist.North Macedonia: Nationalist protesters reject French EU proposal.  Deutsche Welle, 03.07.2022. Macedonian singer Lambe Alabakovski, who burned the documents, was arrested a month earlier by the police in Bitola in connection with the burning of a Bulgarian cultural center in the city. On 5 July, 47 policemen were injured. Protesters threw various items at the parliament building, government building and the building of the Ministry of Internal Affairs in Skopje. Offensive and even vulgar chants against the European Union and Bulgaria were heard during the protests. Slogans were raised that Bulgaria is a “fascist state” and the EU is a “fascist union”. Protesters in Skopje carried mostly the former national flag, abandoned under Greek pressure, because of its relation to the controversial antiquization nation building policy,Anastas Vangeli (2011) Nation-building ancient Macedonian style: the origins and the effects of the so-called antiquization in Macedonia, Nationalities Papers, 39:1, 13-32, as well as red flags with communist symbols, while the European flag was set on fire in one instance. The protesters demanded the resignation of the government and chanted also for the restoration of the former name of the country, disputed by Greece, because of its origin. Violence escalated further when groups of ethnic Macedonians and Albanians, clashed in the centre of Skopje, at the Skanderbeg Square. During the clash demonstrators threw stones at a group of people and three armed people were present, shots were fired into the air. The armed people were later apprehended by the police. As a result of the protests, the "Albanian Alliance" ended any partnership with the opposition, which practically left it isolated, because the other Albanian formations support the government. On 14 July, thousands of protesters protested in front of the parliament, while the French proposal was being discussed. President of the European Commission Ursula von der Leyen came to address the parliament, where she was met with whistles and jeers from the opposition MPs. The opposition MPs wore t-shirts with the word “no’ written on them in red and held up banners against the French proposal. At one point, MP Apasiev served von der Leyen a pamphlet with a large "NO" written on it. Prime Minister Dimitar Kovačevski also addressed the parliament and asked the MPs to accept the deal, while the opposition MPs protested. During the same day, a demonstration march was led by Kumanovo Municipality Mayor Maksim Dimitrievski in Kumanovo. On the next day an opposition lawmaker compared von der Leyen's visit to the Nazis' activity related to the Law for the Prevention of Hereditarily Diseased Offspring. VMRO-DPMNE also threatened that Prime Minister Kovačevski will be in prison for what he is doing to (North) Macedonia and its people. On July 16, the former Foreign Minister from VMRO-DPMNE Antonio Milošoski accused the ruling Social Democrats of treason. A deputy of the SDSM, asked him "who are you to call us traitors, you who has several passports in your pocket", alluding to the claims that he has Bulgarian citizenship, as many other Macedonians. At the end of the same session, with 68 "yes" votes, the parliament approved draft conclusions, giving the government a mandate to negotiate within the so-called "French proposal".

The approved document includes the condition to stop "hate speech" against all "minorities and communities", that North Macedonia recognize a shared history with Bulgaria, and the inclusion of Bulgarian people as a recognized minority in the Constitution. On July 17, North Macedonia signed a special protocol with Bulgaria to cooperate on these subjects. Several protests occurred after the adoption of the French proposal. On July 28, a demonstration was organized in front of the Bulgarian embassy with placards reading "No to the EU", "We don't need Europe",  "No to Bulgarian blackmail", protesters chanting "Bulgarian fascists", and a speaker stating that “Bulgaria is the most Nazi country in EU", the demonstrators painted the Vergina star on the street in front of the embassy. Two more protests were organized in front of the embassy again in August with a low turnout.

 Reactions 
Government of North Macedonia
Prime Minister Dimitar Kovačevski and others condemned the violence which occurred during the protests. The government of North Macedonia and its coalition partners have insisted the protests' organizers are anti-European and pro-Russian elements.Anti-EU protests in capital of North Macedonia, today new calls for violence. Meta.mk, July 5, 2022. Per the Foreign Minister Bujar Osmani, if the French proposal would be declined, inter-ethnic tensions will start in the country. Bujar Osmani, who is a Macedonian Albanian, also appealed to put an end to the hatred against Bulgaria. 
President Pendarovski made a statement that Russian spies from a neighboring country, whose name he refused to mention, were infiltrating North Macedonia. Pendarovski also claimed that these agents were involved in the protests. According to him, Russia finances the opposition in the country.

North Macedonia protest supporters, opposition parties and intellectuals
On June 30 Mickoski as cause of refusal pointed "negotiations are not according to the Copenhagen accession criteria". During the protests on July 12 he affirmed his stance "We have to work to get that EU entry date with dignity; I believe in the idea of ​​a united Balkans in a united Europe; my dream is for proud and dignified Macedonians to be part of the European family". He pointed the causes of the protest against the proposal: the "bilateral problem introduced as part of the negotiations", "no warranties from the EU about the European perspective", "it does not offer start of Macedonian eurointegration" instead it opens to "endless negotiations" In the same interview to Serbian media in which he stated that he would not support the French proposal, which practically was a Bulgarian one. On July 16, after the parliament approved the so-called "French proposal", Mickoski stated that the opposition was yet to block the negotiation process. He announces that it will not allow the inclusion of Bulgarians in the constitution, for which a qualified majority is required. This is a condition without which at some future point the negotiations process will be suspended. On October 22 Mickoski reaffirmed his demand for "warranties from the EU about the European perspective"

Pavle Trajanov the leader of Democratic Union party and PM has similar causes for refusal as Hristijan Mickoski. Pointed out the Copenhagen accession criteria and "bilateral and historic issues" in the framework. He stated his commitments for "full EU membership, but only under the Copenhagen accession criteria, that we already fully fufill". Also the "lack of reciprocity, Bulgaria to recognize the rights of Macedonians living there".

The leader of the "Lеvica" party Dimitar Apasiev stated that there are alternatives to the EU, one of which is the "Serbian example".

800 intellectuals from North Macedonia stated that by accepting the French proposal, the Macedonian people and language will be bulgarised and become a rootless tree, reduced to an artificial construction dating back to the end of the Second World War. "If this is the condition for entering the EU, then we say no", the address concludes.

Bulgarian views and reactions
Observers in Sofia have claimed these are sympathizers of anti-EU opposition parties with pro-Russian and pro-Serbian orientation, which are spreading anti-Bulgarian sentiments. The Bulgarian Foreign Minister Teodora Genchovska described the public reaction in North Macedonia against the French proposal to regulate relations between Sofia and Skopje as "quite worrying". On July 12, an association of the descendants of early 20th century refugees in Bulgaria, from what is today North Macedonia, sent an appeal to the European institutions with the request to put a pressure on Skopje to start negotiations on joining the EU. According to the appeal, the reason for refusing to accept the French proposal was the lack of real decommunization in North Macedonia, more than 30 years after the fall of communism in Europe, which consequence today is the denial of their common cultural and historical heritage until 1945. On the same day, Sofia sent an official note of protest against the numerous manifestations of hatred directed against Bulgaria. According to several Bulgarian analysts, the protests in Skopje were about Bulgarianophobia encouraged by Moscow and Belgrade, "from which the Macedonians don't want to give up. It is the basis of their ethnic identity and the Macedonians are afraid that without it, they will cease to exist. In such case they don't need the EU. The battle in Skopje is as much against Bulgaria, as it is against Europe". According to some Bulgarian analysts, belated communism has been swirling on the streets of Skopje, while according to others, this is a neo-fascism.Николай Овчаров, Задава ли се „обикновен фашизъм“ в Северна Македония.Trud.bg, 09.07.2022. According to Bulgarian analyst Nikolay Krastev, the protests were anti-European.

US and EU views and reactions 
On July 9, in a joint statement, the High Representative of the Union for Foreign Affairs and Security Policy Josep Borrell and the US Secretary of State Antony Blinken welcomed France's proposal as based on mutual respect, trust and understanding, calling for the necessary decision to be taken for the country to continue on its European path.

"The future of your country is in the European Union''", wrote the President of the European Commission, Ursula von der Leyen, in a tweet in Macedonian language, after she visited  Skopje on July 14, during the visit she addressed the Parliament. Von der Leyen's message was met with negative reactions from Macedonian Twitter users, judging by the comments they left. According to her, the acceptance of the French proposal will enable the unblocking of European integration and the opening of the first phase of the accession negotiations, which will represent a positive impulse for the reform process and the progress of North Macedonia.
On July 31, the EU Ambassador in Skopje, David Geer, has warned that if the country does not change its constitution, the negotiation process will stop.

Albanian reactions
On July 14, the Albanian Prime Minister Edi Rama announced that he would demand that Albania be separated in its European path from the Macedonian-Bulgarian dispute, if the French proposal doesn't receive a "positive answer" in Skopje.

See also 
 List of protests in the 21st century
 2011 Macedonian protests
 2015 Macedonian protests
 2016 Macedonian protests
 2017 storming of Macedonian Parliament

Notes

References

2022 protests
Protests
July 2022 events in Europe
August 2022 events in Europe
2020s in Skopje
Euroscepticism
Anti-Bulgarian sentiment
Events in Skopje
Politics of North Macedonia
Modern history of North Macedonia
North Macedonia–European Union relations
Bulgaria–North Macedonia relations
Bulgaria–France relations
France–North Macedonia relations